Jai Vikraanta is a 1995 Bollywood action crime drama film directed and produced by Sultan Ahmed. It stars Sanjay Dutt, Zeba Bakhtiyar and Amrish Puri.

Plot
Choudhary Amar Singh is a farmer in rural India and lives a modest lifestyle with his wife, Sharda, and son, Vikraanta. He excels in sugar cane production and is presented with an award and a tractor by the State Government. He has named his farm after his son, and expects him to continue farming. Amar's efforts are to remove the debts that he and other farmers have incurred from Zamindars. This does not augur well with Thakur Pratap Singh, who arranges Amar's death. This incident turns the lives of Vikraanta and Sharda upside down, compelling Vikraanta to make a commitment to avenge his father's death, not knowing that he himself is placing his own life in jeopardy.

Cast
Sanjay Dutt as Vikraanta A. Singh
Reema Lagoo as Mother Of Vikraanta A.Singh
Zeba Bakhtiar as Nirmala "Nimu"
Amrish Puri as Thakur Jaswant Singh
Mukesh Khanna as Thakur Harnam Singh
Shahbaaz Khan as DIG Sher Ali Khan
Suresh Oberoi as Raja
Deepti Naval as Harnam's Wife
Aruna Irani as Sakina
Saeed Jaffrey as Police Commissioner
Ranjeet as Inspector Khote
Jayshree Arora as Nimu's mother
Mohsin Memon as Suraj (Vikraanta's Son)

Soundtrack
The film's music was composed by Anand–Milind and the lyrics by Sameer.

References

External links

1990s Hindi-language films
1995 films
Films scored by Anand–Milind
Indian action drama films
Indian crime action films
1990s action drama films